Mario Riccoboni (16 February 1889 – 15 May 1968) was an Italian sprinter. He competed in the men's 100 metres at the 1920 Summer Olympics.

References

External links
 

1889 births
1968 deaths
Athletes (track and field) at the 1920 Summer Olympics
Italian male sprinters
Olympic athletes of Italy
Place of birth missing
People from Sampierdarena